Lakeland is the most populous city in Polk County, Florida, part of the Tampa Bay Area, located along Interstate 4 east of Tampa. According to the 2020 U.S. Census Bureau release, the city had a population of 112,641. Lakeland is a principal city of the Lakeland–Winter Haven Metropolitan Statistical Area.

European-American settlers arrived in Lakeland from Missouri, Kentucky, Tennessee, Georgia and South Carolina in the 1870s. The city expanded in the 1880s with the arrival of rail service, with the first freedmen railway workers settling here in 1883. They and European immigrants also came because of land development opportunities with farming, citrus, cattle and phosphate industry developing. Lakeland is home to the 1,267-acre Circle B Bar Reserve.

History

Prehistory

The first Paleo-Indians reached the central Florida area near the end of the last ice age, as they followed big game south. As the ice melted and sea levels rose, these Native Americans ended up staying and thrived on the peninsula for thousands of years. By the time the first Spanish conquistadors arrived, an estimated 350,000 Native Americans were living in what is now the state of Florida. Some of these first early tribes were the Tocobago, Timucua, and Calusa.

In 1527, a Spanish map showed a settlement near the Rio de la Paz. The arrival of the Spanish turned out to be disastrous to these Native American tribes. Within 150 years, the majority of the pre-Columbian Native American peoples of Florida had been wiped out. Those who had not succumbed to diseases such as smallpox or yellow fever were either killed or enslaved. Little is left of these first Native Americans cultures in Polk County except for scant archaeological records, including a few personal artifacts and shell mounds. Eventually, the remnants of these tribes merged with the Creek Indians who had arrived from the north and became the Seminole Indian tribe.

Early history

In the 18th century Native Americans groups, collectively called "Seminoles", moved into the areas left vacant. In 1823 the United States and the various tribes in Florida signed the Treaty of Moultrie Creek, which created a reservation in central Florida that included what is now Polk County. Starting in 1832 the United States government tried to move the Seminoles in Florida west to the Indian Territory. Most of the Seminoles resisted, resulting in the Second Seminole War, 1835–1842. By the end of that war, most of the Seminoles had been sent west, with a few remnants pushed well south of what is now Polk County.

Statehood and the 19th century
Florida became a state in 1845, and Polk County was established in 1861. After the American Civil War, the county seat was established southeast of Lakeland in Bartow. While most of Polk County's early history centered on the two cities of Bartow and Fort Meade, eventually, people entered the areas in northern Polk County and began settling in the areas which became Lakeland.

Lakeland was first settled in the 1870s and began to develop as the rail lines reached the area in 1884. Freedmen settled here in 1883, starting development of what became the African-American neighborhood of Moorehead. Lakeland was incorporated January 1, 1885. The town was founded by Abraham Munn (a resident of Louisville, Kentucky), who purchased  of land in what is now downtown Lakeland in 1882 and platted the land for the town in 1884. Lakeland was named for the many lakes near the town site.

In April 1898, the Spanish–American War began and started a crucial point in Lakeland's development. While the war ended quickly and had little effect on most of the nation, the Florida peninsula was used as a launching point for military forces in the war. The then small town of Lakeland housed over 9,000 troops. The 10th Cavalry Regiment, one of the original Buffalo Soldier regiments, were housed on the banks of Lake Wire. Soon after being stationed there, the black troops faced conflict with the local white population. In one event, a local druggist refused to sell to black soldiers and an argument ensued which eventually escalated to the point where the druggist brandished a pistol. The soldiers shot the druggist before he could fire, which resulted in two of the troops being arrested.

The Florida Boom and the 20th century
The Florida boom resulted in the construction of many significant structures in Lakeland, a number of which are now listed on the National Register of Historic Places. This list includes the Terrace Hotel, New Florida Hotel (Regency Tower, currently Lake Mirror Tower), Polk Theatre, Frances Langford Promenade, Polk Museum of Art (not a product of the 1920s boom), Park Trammell Building (formerly the Lakeland Public Library and today the Lakeland Chamber of Commerce), and others. The city also has several historic districts that have many large buildings built during the 1920s and 1940s. The Cleveland Indians held spring training there from 1923 to 1927 at Henley Field Ball Park. Parks were developed surrounding Lake Mirror, including Barnett Children's Park, Hollis Gardens, and the newest, Allen Kryger Park.

The "boom" period went "bust" quickly, and years passed before the city recovered. Part of the re-emergence was due to the arrival of the Detroit Tigers baseball team in 1934 for spring training. The Tigers still train at Lakeland's Joker Marchant Stadium and own the city's Class A Florida State League team, the Lakeland Flying Tigers. In the mid-1930s, the Works Progress Administration built the Lakeland Municipal Airport.

In 1938, Florida Southern College President Ludd Spivey invited architect Frank Lloyd Wright to design a "great education temple in Florida." Wright worked on the project for over 20 years as Spivey found ways to fund it and find construction workers during World War II. Wright's original plan called for 18 structures; in total he designed 30, but only 12 were completed. Wright's textile block motif is used extensively on the campus. The concrete blocks he used are in need of restoration.

Wright titled the project Child of the Sun, describing his Florida Southern buildings as being "out of the ground, into the light, a child of the sun." It is the largest single-site collection of Frank Lloyd Wright buildings in the world, and attracts 30,000 visitors each year. In 1975, the "Florida Southern Architectural District" was added to the National Register of Historic Places. In 2012, Wright's campus was designated as a National Historic Landmark by the National Park Service.

World War II

At the beginning of World War II, the Lakeland School of Aeronautics—headquartered at the recently built Lakeland Municipal Airport—became part of a nationwide network of civilian flight schools enjoined for the war effort by the United States Army Air Corps.

Between 1940 and 1945, more than 8,000 Army Air Corps and Army Air Forces cadets trained on two-seater Stearman PT-17 and PT-13 biplanes at the school (renamed the Lodwick School of Aeronautics in the midst of this period).

From June 1941 until October 1942, 1,327 British Royal Air Force cadets trained at the Lakeland facility. The Lodwick School of Aeronautics closed in 1945. The airport ceased flight operations in the 1960; the site has since then housed the Detroit Tigers' "Tiger Town" baseball complex.

Geography and climate

Lakeland is within the Central Florida Highlands area of the Atlantic coastal plain, with a terrain consisting of flatland interspersed with gently rolling hills.

Lakes

The dominant feature in Lakeland is the city's many lakes. Thirty-eight lakes are named, with a number of other bodies of water unnamed, mostly phosphate mine pits that eventually filled with water. Much of the culture of Lakeland revolves around its many lakes, and many people use the lakes as reference points in much the same way people in other towns use streets as reference points, such as "I live near Lake Beulah." In addition to Lake Parker, some of the more prominent lakes in the Lakeland area are Lake Hollingsworth, Lake Morton, Lake Mirror, and Lake Gibson.

Swans are one of the most visible features on the lakes near downtown Lakeland. They have a long history, the first swans appearing around 1923. By 1954, the swans were gone, eradicated by alligators and pets. A Lakeland resident who mourned the passing of the swans wrote to Queen Elizabeth. The royal family allowed the capture of two of the royal swans, and the swans now on the lakes of Lakeland are the descendants of the one surviving royal swan sent by the Queen.

In July 2006, Scott Lake, one of the city's lakes, was almost totally drained by a cluster of sinkholes. Later the lake partially refilled.

Climate

Lakeland, like most other parts of Florida north of Lake Okeechobee, is in the humid subtropical zone (Köppen climate classification: Cfa). Typically, summers are hot and humid with high temperatures seldom dropping below 90 °F and 70 °F for the overnight low. Like most of Central Florida, afternoon thunderstorms are the norm throughout the summer. Winters in Lakeland are drier and warm, with frequent sunny skies. High temperatures range in the mid 70s during the day, with lows in the 50s. Cold snaps drop temperatures below freezing twice a year on average.

Demographics

As of 2010, 48,218 households were in the city, with 15.5% being vacant. As of 2000, 23.5% had children under the age of 18 living with them, 43.5% were married couples living together, 13.7% had a female householder with no husband present, and 39% were individuals and nontraditional families. About 32.9% of all households were made up of individuals, and 14.9% had someone living alone who was 65 years of age or older. The average household size was 2.23 and the average family size was 2.82.

As of the 2010 census, the city was 20.9% Black or African American, 70.8% White, 0.3% Native American, 1.8% Asian, 0.1% Native Hawaiian, and 2.7% were two or more races. Of the population 12.6% were of Hispanic or Latino ancestry.

In 2000, the city the population was spread out, with 21.4% under the age of 18, 10.3% from 18 to 24, 24.7% from 25 to 44, 20.6% from 45 to 64, and 23.0% who were 65 years of age or older. The median age was 40 years. For every 100 females, there were 86.8 males. For every 100 females age 18 and over, there were 82.1 males.

In 2000, the median income for a household in the city was $16,119, and for a family was $17,468. Males had a median income of $14,137 versus $9,771 for females. The per capita income for the city was $15,760. About 47% of families and 35% of the population were below the poverty line, including 97% of those under age 18 and 9% of those age 65 or over. In 2008–2012, the per capita income was $23,817 and the median household income was $40,284. Persons below the poverty line in 2008–2012 were 17.5% according to the US Census.

Languages

As of 2000, those who spoke only English at home accounted for 91% of all residents, while 9% spoke other languages at home. The most significant were Spanish speakers who made up 6.4% of the population, while German came up as the third-most spoken language, which made up 0.8%, and French was fourth, with 0.5% of the population.

Religion

In 1913, the Wolfson family arrived from Lithuania and became the first Jewish settlers to the area. After some struggles, the Jewish community in Lakeland flourished and the first synagogue, Temple Emanuel opened in 1932.  
The Rohr Jewish Learning Institute presents classes and seminars in Lakewood in partnership with Chabad of Lakeland.

Lakeland is home to the Swaminarayan Hindu Temple, which was established in 2005.

In 1994, the first and only mosque in the county was established. It was called Masjid Aisha, but is now called the Islamic Center of Lakeland.

Christianity makes up the largest religious group in Lakeland. As of 2013, an estimated 300 churches existed with an address in the city.

Economy

Lakeland is the largest city on Interstate 4 between Orlando and Tampa. Large industries in the Lakeland area are citrus, cattle, and phosphate mining. In the past few decades, tourism, medicine, insurance, transportation, and music have grown in importance.

Citrus growing dates back to the early settlers who planted trees in the area in the 1850s. After a series of freezes in counties north of Polk County, the area became the focal point for citrus growing in Florida. Although citrus is no longer the largest industry in the area, it still plays a large part in the economy of Lakeland and Polk County.

Phosphate mining is still important to the economy of Lakeland, although most of the mining now takes place farther south. The Bone Valley produced 25% of the U.S. phosphate supply.

Lakeland's largest employer is Publix Supermarkets. Publix is one of the largest regional grocery chains in the United States with over 1,200 stores across the American South. Publix employs over 6,500 people in the Lakeland area including headquarter and warehouse employees.

Lakeland is a transportation hub. FedEx Freight and FedEx Services and the Saddle Creek Corporation employ over 600 people in the area. Other large employers in the area include Amazon, GEICO, Rooms To Go, and Lakeland Regional Health.

Culture

The Lakeland History Room is a special collections archive established in 1987 housed within the Lakeland Public Library's main branch. The Lakeland History Room maintains the City's collection of historical materials as well as other locally relevant collections composed of documents, photographs, maps, building plans, audio/visual media, scrapbooks, specialty items like citrus crate labels, artwork, yearbooks, posters, and postcards. The LHR maintains a large digital collection with over 7,000 images of the city of Lakeland, its landmarks, significant historical moments, cultural institutions, and prominent citizens. The LHR provides one-on-one assistance with historic research, a history lecture series with prominent local historians, a DIY Digitizing Lab for personal material preservation, and genealogical programs and resources.

In 2019, an initiative led by Lakeland City Commissioner Phillip Walker, was first presented to the City Commission to create the City's first History and Culture Center. The project was unanimously approved by the Commission and funds were allocated for the project's construction; although, the exhibit's content design would be funded by local donations and grant funding. An advisory committee made up of educators, city officials, local business owners, and civic and community leaders, led by former Mayor Gow Fields, was established to organize and advise the City in the design, content, and construction of the exhibit. The Lakeland Public Library was eventually chosen as the location of the future exhibit space due to its central location within the city, its status as a community hub, and because it was the current home of the city's local archive, the Lakeland History Room, which would be expanded into the Lakeland History and Culture Center. Construction on the project is currently underway and it is unknown when the project will be completed.

Historic districts

 Beacon Hill-Alta Vista Residential District
 Biltmore-Cumberland Historic District
 Dixieland Historic District
 East Lake Morton Residential District
 Lake Hunter Terrace Historic District
 Munn Park Historic District
 South Lake Morton Historic District

Buildings and locations

 
 Central Avenue School
 Cleveland Court School
 Florida Southern College
 John F. Cox Grammar School
 Lakeland Center
 Lakeland Square Mall
 Lakeside Village
 Old Lakeland High School
 James Henry Mills Medal of Honor Parkway
 Oates Building
 Polk State College
 Polk Museum of Art
 Polk Theatre
 Southeastern University (Florida)
 USA International Speedway
 Florida Polytechnic University
 Winston School
 Without Walls Central Church – a local/regional megachurch
 Silvermoon Drive-in
 Bonnet Springs

Sports

Stadiums

Joker Marchant Stadium, north of downtown, hosts spring training for the Detroit Tigers, as well as their Lakeland Flying Tigers class-A Florida State League and GCL Tigers rookie-league Gulf Coast League minor league baseball teams.

RP Funding Center is also home to two indoor sports teams. The Lakeland Magic is a basketball team playing in the NBA G League and is an affiliate of the Orlando Magic. The Florida Tropics SC is an indoor soccer team playing in the Major Arena Soccer League. The Tropics organization also operates an outdoor team, the Lakeland Tropics, which competes in the Premier Development League. The Florida Tarpons were an indoor football team playing in the American Arena League for one season after relocating from Estero, Florida.

History of sports teams
In the 1980s, the Lakeland Center briefly played host to the indoor version of the Tampa Bay Rowdies soccer team. The Lakeland Center has also hosted a few hockey teams, the Lakeland Ice Warriors, the Lakeland Prowlers, and the Lakeland Loggerheads. The United States Basketball League once had a team here as well called the Lakeland Blue Ducks. Sun 'n Fun was home to Lakeland's only roller derby league, the Lakeland Derby Dames; however, the team was dissolved in November 2015.

The Lakeland Center also hosts the Florida High School Athletic Association's state basketball finals.

Government and politics

Lakeland is governed by a six-member city council. Four members are elected from single-member districts; the other two are elected at-large, requiring them to gain a majority of the votes. The mayor is elected.

Mayor

The City of Lakeland was incorporated on January 1, 1885. The mayor is one of seven members of the City Commission, acting as the board chair and performing mostly ceremonial and procedural duties beyond the powers of the other six. Prior to 1988, the City Commission selected Lakeland's mayor from among its members. Mayors can be on the board for up to 12 years in a lifetime, or 16 years in combination with holding a regular commission position.  Lakeland's first mayor was J.W. Trammell.

The first female mayor was Lois Q. Searl, who served in 1965.
The 1970 municipal election placed the first African-American on the City Commission, Dr. John S. Jackson.  In 1972, he became the first black mayor for the city.
In 1980, Carrie R. Oldham became Lakeland's first African-American female mayor.

Since 1988 the mayor has been elected by the city's voters.

 John W. Trammell, 1885 
 John D. Torrence, 1885 
 Eppes C. Tucker Sr., 1886, 1887, 1888 
 Napoleon B. Bowyer, 1889, 1890 
 Herbert J. Drane, 1888–1892
 J. T. Park, 1894 
 Clarence A. Boswell, 1894–1896 
 James P. Thompson, 1897, 1899 
 Samuel L.A. Clonts, 1898, 1903, 1904, 1912
 C. M. Marsh, 1898 
 Park Trammell, 1900–1902
 John F. Cox, 1905–1907, 1911, 1916, 1917 
 John S. Edwards, 1909 
 Jackson, William K., 1910 
 Oscar M. Eaton, 1913–1915 
 Edwin C. Flanagan, 1918, 1919 
 Frank H. Thompson, 1920 
 Hubert C. Petteway, 1921 
 J.T. Hodges, 1922,1923
 Daniel C. Boswell, 1924 
 John W. Buchanan Jr., 1925 
 J. Bunyan Smith, 1926 
 Jesse F. Council, 1927, 1928 
 William S. Rodgers, 1927 
 William F. Reid, 1928, 1931 
 Charles I. Dwiggins, 1929 
 H. Dean Grady, 1930, 1931 
 Benjamin M. Pulliam, 1932 
 Elijah A. Godwin, 1933, 1935 
 Edward L. Mack, 1934 
 George W. Mershon, 1936 
 H. Clay Haynes, 1937
 Lutie M. Koons, 1938 
 Thomas D. Conter, 1939 
 Ira C. Hopper, 1940 
 George J. Tolson, 1941, 1944, 1947
 Elmer E. Kelly Jr., 1942 
 Horace W. Gibson, 1943 
 William Cade, 1945, 1948 
 Edwin C. Flanagan Jr., 1946 
 Clinton V. McClurg, 1948 
 Ernest B. Sutton, 1949 
 Guerry L. Dobbins, 1950 
 Clayton Logan, 1951
 James J. Musso, 1952, 1958 
 Norman T. Kent, 1953
 Wilbur Y. Wooten, 1954
 S. Scott Kelly, 1955
 Mac H. Cunningham, 1956 
 Earl W. Bowen, 1957 
 William M. Hollis, 1958 
 R. Tom Joyner Jr., c. 1959
 William G. Cooper Jr., 1960 
 Reuben H. Gibson, 1961 
 Morris J. Pritchard, 1962 
 William H. Lofton, 1963 
 R. Harold Grizzard, 1964 
 James R. West, 1965
 Lois Q. Searl, 1965 
 John H. Woodall Jr., 1966 
 W. Jack Day, 1967 
 George W. Trask, 1968, 1969, 1974 
 Marvin H. Henderson Jr., 1970
 Joe P. Ruthven, 1971 
 Charles E. Whitten, 1972 
 John S. Jackson, 1972, 1973 
 W. Carl Dicks, 1975 
 Peggy C. Brown, 1976, 1984 
 Charles A. Coleman, 1977 
 John Tolson, 1977 
 Curtis I. Walker, 1978 
 George R. Burt, 1979 
 Carrie R. Oldham, 1980, first African-American female mayor 
 R. Larry Turnipseed, 1981 
 J. Larry Durrence, 1982, 1986 
 Frank J. O'Reilly, 1983, 1987, 1989–1993 
 Thomas R. Shaw, 1985 
 Willie J. Williams, 1988 
 Buddy Fletcher, 1993–2009
 Gow Fields, 2010–2013, first African-American mayor elected in the city
 R. Howard Wiggs, 2014–2018
 Bill Mutz, 2018–present

Law enforcement

On September 28, 2006, Polk County Sheriff's Deputy Vernon "Matt" Williams and his K-9 partner Diogi were shot and killed after a routine traffic stop in the Wabash area of Lakeland. More than 500 police officers from a variety of law enforcement agencies joined in a search for Angilo Freeland, suspected of murdering Williams and stealing his gun. Freeland was found hiding in a rural area the next morning. Nine officers from five different law enforcement agencies surrounded Freeland and shot him when he raised Williams' stolen gun at them. A total of 110 shots were fired, and Freeland was hit 68 times, killing him instantly. Multiple investigations concluded the officers' use of force was justified. Deputy Williams and Diogi were laid to rest on October 3, 2006, after a funeral that included a one-hour-and-45-minute procession to Auburndale.

In 2021, the Lakeland Police Department hired numerous former NYPD officers. Two of the new hires failed to disclose that they had been disciplined by the NYPD, and one new hire used to work in the NYPD's notorious anti-crime units which were disbanded after high-profile scandals.

Education

The 28 elementary schools, seven middle schools, six traditional high schools, and three magnet-choice high schools in the Lakeland area are run by the Polk County School Board.

Traditional public high schools

 Mulberry Senior High School
 George W. Jenkins High School
 Kathleen High School
 Lake Gibson High School
 Lakeland Senior High School
 Tenoroc High School

Magnet high schools

 Central Florida Aerospace Academy
 Lois Cowles Harrison Center for the Visual and Performing Arts
 Polk State College Lakeland Collegiate High School

Traditional public middle schools

 Kathleen Middle School
 Lake Gibson Middle School
 Crystal Lake Middle school
 Sleepy Hill Middle School
 Lakeland Highlands Middle School
 Southwest Middle School

Magnet middle schools

Lawton Chiles Middle School
Rochelle School of the Arts (elementary and middle)

Charter schools

McKeel Academy of Technology
 Lakeland Montessori Schoolhouse
 Lakeland Montessori Middle School
 Lakeland Collegiate High school
 Magnolia Montessori Academy

Private schools

Calvary Baptist Church Academy
Geneva Classical Academy
Heritage Christian Academy
Lakeland Christian Preparatory School
Lakeland Christian School
Parkway Christian Academy
Resurrection Catholic School
Santa Fe Catholic High School
Sonrise Christian School
St Anthony
St Joseph
St Lukes
St Paul Lutheran School 
Victory Christian Academy
Excel Christian Academy

Colleges and universities

Florida Polytechnic University
Florida Southern College
Florida Technical College
Keiser University 
Webster University
Polk State College
Southeastern University
Whitefield Theological Seminary

A number of opportunities exist for higher education around the Lakeland area. Southeastern University is the largest university in the area, with undergraduate enrollment around 6200. Southeastern is affiliated with the Assemblies of God. Florida Southern College, established in 1883 and with a current undergraduate enrollment of just over 2600, is on Lake Hollingsworth. Florida Southern is the home of the world's largest single-site collection of Frank Lloyd Wright architecture. In July 2008, the University of South Florida's Lakeland campus was granted partial autonomy by Governor Charlie Crist and became Florida Polytechnic University. Florida Polytechnic (FLPoly) is just inside the Lakeland's northeast border at the intersection of I-4 and Polk Parkway. They also have some administrative offices on the campus of Polk State College on Winter Lake Road. FLPoly is focused on STEM degree programs, such as engineering and computer science. Both Everest University and Keiser University, two multisite, accredited universities, have locations in Lakeland. Traviss Career Center is a vocational school. Webster University offers on-site, regionally accredited graduate degree programs in business and counseling at their Lakeland Metropolitan Campus

Media

Polk County is within the Tampa Bay television market. Charter Spectrum is the cable television franchise serving Lakeland, which offers most television stations from the Tampa Bay market, as well as WFTV, the ABC affiliate from Orlando. WMOR-TV, an independent television station, is licensed to Lakeland, with its studios in Tampa and its transmitter in Riverview.

Lakeland and Polk County are within its own radio market. Local radio stations include:

 WLKF 1430 AM
 WONN 1230 AM
 WWAB 1330 AM
 WPCV 97.5 FM
 WWRZ 98.3 FM
 
WLLD 94.1 FM is licensed to Lakeland, but has wider focus on the Tampa Bay area, with studios in St. Petersburg. WKES 91.1 FM is also licensed to Lakeland as part of the statewide Moody Radio Florida network, with studios in Seminole, near St. Petersburg. Most major stations from Tampa Bay and a few from Orlando are also available.

Print media include The Ledger, a local newspaper owned by Gannett. Patterson Jacobs Media Group publishes a magazine, The Lakelander.

Infrastructure

Transportation

Because Lakeland is the largest city on Interstate 4 between Tampa and Orlando, the city is an important transportation hub. The county nickname, Imperial Polk County, was coined because a large bond issue in 1914 enabled wide roads between the cities of Polk County.

The important freeways and highways in Lakeland today are:
  (Interstate 4) is the main interstate in central Florida linking Tampa, Lakeland, Orlando, and Daytona Beach.
  (or Polk Parkway), is a tolled beltway around Lakeland, with both ends terminating at Interstate 4. Although its shape, location, and tolls makes it impractical as a "bypass" road, it is useful as a way of getting from part of town to another and providing access to I-4 from most parts of the city.
 , following Memorial Boulevard for most of the city, was the route leading to both Tampa and Orlando before I-4 was built; US 92 is still a main road leading to Plant City going west, and Auburndale, Winter Haven, and Haines City going east.
 , going south, follows Bartow Road and leads to Bartow, the county seat. Heading north out of town, it provides a route to Dade City.
 , following mostly rural land, provides access to Lake County and the Florida Turnpike.
 , following Florida Avenue, the main north–south route in Lakeland, is also the main road leading south to Mulberry.
 , Winter-Lake Road, is in southern Lakeland, leading to Winter Haven and Legoland Florida.

Bicycle routes

In recent years, the Lakeland area has developed a number of paved, multi-use bicycle routes including the Lake-To-Lakes Trail, which runs from Lake Parker through downtown, past several lakes, ending at Lake John. Other routes include University Trail, which connects Polk State College to Florida Polytechnic University, and the Fort Fraser Trail, which runs along US Highway 98 from Polk State College to Highway 60 in Bartow.

Public transportation

 Lakeland Amtrak Station
 Lakeland Linder International Airport In 2017, Linder received its first international flight and was renamed Lakeland Linder International Airport in 2018.
 Lakeland Greyhound Terminal
 Citrus Connection local bus service.

Utilities

Water and wastewater in the Lakeland area is managed by Lakeland Water Utilities, municipal water supply is treated at local water plants, T.B. Williams and C. Wayne Combee. The water is mainly supplied by wells that draw from the Floridan aquifer. Power is generated by a nonprofit public power utility, Lakeland Electric.

Lakeland Electric is a municipal utility and government department of the city of Lakeland, Florida.
 Lakeland was the third city in the state of Florida to have electric lighting powered in 1891 by The Lakeland Light and Power Company after Jacksonville and Tampa. Over a decade later in 1904, citizens purchased the private light power plant for $7,500 establishing the locally owned, municipal utility known today as Lakeland Electric.

Power plants

Lakeland Electric powers the city of Lakeland by two power plants, C.D. McIntosh Power Plant, coal-natural gas combined cycle plant slated to phase out in 2024, and Larsen Memorial.
 The last coal unit at C.D. McIntosh Power Plant is slated to phase out in 2024 a plan presented by the Lakeland Electric staff in 2019.

Notable people

Entertainment

 Nat Adderley, jazz cornetist and composer
 Lindsey Alley, Mouseketeer and actress
 Bobby Braddock, record producer in Country Music Hall of Fame
 Howard J. Buss, composer
 Charleene Closshey, film/Broadway actress, musician, and producer
 Copeland, pop/alternative rock band
 Jonny Diaz, Christian musician
 Samantha Dorman, Playboy Playmate
 Rhea Durham, Victoria's Secret model
 Faith Evans, singer
 Stephen Baron Johnson, painter
 Frances Langford, singer, actress, and radio star (1930s and 1940s)
 Neva Jane Langley, Miss America 1953
 Mike Marshall, bluegrass musician and mandolinist
 Kara Monaco, Playboy Playmate
 Robert Phillips, guitarist
 Lauren Miller Rogen, actress
 Forrest Sawyer, NBC reporter and anchor
 SoulJa, rapper
 Steve1989MREInfo, YouTube personality
 J. D. Sumner, singer and songwriter
 Dan White (1908–1980), American actor in film and television
 Monte Yoho, drummer for Outlaws

Sports

 George Almones, NBA Player
 Dwayne Bacon, NBA Player
 Danny Baggish, pro darts player
 Andy Bean, PGA Tour golfer
 Ahmad Black, NFL player, Tampa Bay Buccaneers
 Keon Broxton- Milwaukee Brewers Center Fielder
 Desmond Clark, NFL player, Chicago Bears
 Lance Davis, MLB player, Cincinnati Reds
 Matt Diaz, former MLB player 
 Paul Edinger, NFL player, Minnesota Vikings and Chicago Bears
 Justin Forsett, running back, UC Berkeley
 Carson Fulmer, former Vanderbilt baseball player, drafted 8th overall by Chicago White Sox 
 Kenneth Gant, NFL safety
 Ronnie Ghent, football player
 Matt Grothe, quarterback, South Florida Bulls
 Nick Hamilton, pro wrestling referee
 Killian Hayes, basketball player
 Alice Haylett, AAGPBL All-Star pitcher
 Drew Hutchison, MLB pitcher
 Lee Janzen, PGA Tour golfer, U.S. Open winner
 Ray Lewis, NFL player, Baltimore Ravens, Super Bowl champion and MVP, 2-time NFL Defensive Player of the Year
 Freddie Mitchell, NFL player, Philadelphia Eagles and Kansas City Chiefs
 Joe Nemechek, NASCAR Sprint Cup driver
 Joe Niekro, MLB knuckleball pitcher
 Lance Niekro, MLB player, San Francisco Giants
 Steve Pearce, MLB player, Boston Red Sox
 Maurkice Pouncey, NFL player, Pittsburgh Steelers
 Mike Pouncey, former NFL player
 Boog Powell, former MLB player
 Chris Rainey, NFL player, Pittsburgh Steelers
 Andrew Reynolds, professional skateboarder
 Chris Sale, MLB player, Boston Red Sox
 Brenda Sell, Taekwondo Grandmaster 
 Rod Smart, NFL & XFL player 
 Donnell Smith, NFL player, Green Bay Packers and New England Patriots
 Ron Smith, NFL player, Los Angeles Rams
 Bill Spivey, basketball player
 Jameson Taillon, MLB pitcher, New York Yankees
 Adarius Taylor, NFL linebacker
 Jim Thomas, NBA player
 Justin Verlander, MLB pitcher, Houston Astros
 Chris Waters, former MLB player
 Brooks Wilson, MLB pitcher, Atlanta Braves

Other

 Charles T. Canady, Chief Justice, Florida Supreme Court
 Lawton Chiles, Senator and Governor of Florida
 Carol Jenkins Barnett, philanthropist and businesswoman, the daughter of George W. Jenkins
 George W. Jenkins, founder of Publix Super Markets
 R. Albert Mohler Jr., president of Southern Baptist Theological Seminary
 Marvin Pipkin, scientist engineer that had many inventions and innovations for the light bulb.
 Gene Ready, Florida businessman and state legislator
 Charles Z. Smith, Associate Justice, Washington State Supreme Court
 Park Trammell, Mayor of Lakeland, Florida Attorney General, Governor of Florida and U.S. Senator

Sister cities

Lakeland Sister Cities International (LSCI), a chapter of Sister Cities International, was formed in 1990 with Lakeland's first sister city Richmond Hill, Canada.
 Bălți, Moldova (since 1997)
 Chongming County, Shanghai, China (since 2007)
 Imabari, Ehime, Japan (since 1995)
 Portmore, Jamaica (since 2009)
 Richmond Hill, Ontario, Canada (since 1990)

In popular culture
In 1990, Lakeland made its Hollywood debut when the Southgate Shopping Center was featured in the movie Edward Scissorhands. It was also used in the filming of the Judd Nelson movie Endure. Classrooms from Florida Southern College were used in the Adam Sandler comedy, The Waterboy. The Lakeland civic center also was the filming location for music video for Little Red Corvette by Prince (musician).

See also

 List of people from Lakeland, Florida
 Loyce Harpe Park

References

Bibliography

External links

 Official website 
 Lakeland Chamber of Commerce
 
 

 
1884 establishments in Florida
Cities in Florida
Cities in Polk County, Florida
Populated places established in 1884